Wayne Harley Brachman is a pastry chef who worked in The Firebird restaurant.

Early life

When Brachman was not yet a pastry chef his job was a junior high orchestra teacher. Brachman was offered his first pastry job in a Massachusetts restaurant that had just lost its chef. He dove right into the job, and the rest speaks for itself. A completely self-taught chef, Wayne has never taken any cooking classes nor worked under another chef. His first daughter Isabella was born while he was working at Mesa Grill. His Second daughter Violet was born 3 years later.

Becoming a pastry chef

After learning his trade in Massachusetts, he landed a job in New York City as the pastry chef at The Odeon, then moved on to Arizona 206. Wayne then teamed up with Bobby Flay, becoming the Executive Pastry Chef at Mesa Grill and Bolo. As of March 2005, Brachman was no longer employed at FireBird restaurant and was working freelance in New York City.

In 1998, Chocolatier Magazine named him one of the "Best 10 Pastry Chefs". Wayne's first book, Cakes and Cowpokes (William Morrow 1995) explores Southwestern desserts, while Retro Desserts (William Morrow 2000) takes a look back at classic American favorites. He is the co-host of the Food Network program The Melting Pot and currently appears in the Food Network program Sweet Dreams which is hosted by Gale Gand.

Bibliography
Cakes and Cowpokes (1995) 
Retro Desserts (2000) 
American Desserts (2003) 
See Dad Cook (2005)

References

Year of birth missing (living people)
Living people
American male chefs
American chefs
Pastry chefs
Place of birth missing (living people)